Joe Beam is an inspirational speaker and best-selling author. He founded Family Dynamics Institute in 1994 and served as its president until he founded Love Path International in 2008. He has appeared on television and radio programs including The Today Show, The Weekend Today Show, ABC's Good Morning America, Focus on the Family, the Montel Williams Show, and the Mike and Juliet Show. Beam has been featured in articles by magazines such as People and Better Homes and Gardens. He hosted Give and Take—a national radio show in which he provided advice on relationships ranging from romance to parenting. The show went off the air in September 2008 due to production negotiations.

Career 

Beam earned his bachelor's degree in theology (magna cum laude) from Southern Christian University. He did graduate studies in clinical psychology at the University of Evansville and earned a PhD in health science at the University of Sydney.

He has authored magazine articles, corporate training programs, and several books including the national bestseller Seeing the Unseen, Forgiven Forever, and Becoming One: Emotionally, Spiritually, and Sexually. Joe and his wife Alice collaborated with Nick and Nancy Stinnett to write Fantastic Families. He is often invited to universities, churches, and community groups to speak about marriage and family relationships from a Christian perspective. Beam served as minister at Western Hills Church of Christ in Nashville, TN until leaving in 2014.

Guidelines on sex 

Sexual activity in marriage is allowed by God if:
 It doesn't involve other people
 It doesn't involve animals
 It does not cause harm to one another

Beam also states that:
 Oral sex is not a sin.
 Usage of vibrators or other instruments is not a sin.

These statements came from viewers and listener reviews, and were answered by Joe Beam.

Selected bibliography 

 1998 Seeing the Unseen
 1998 Forgiven Forever: The Full Force of God's Tender Mercy
 1999 Becoming One: Emotionally, Spiritually and Sexually
 1999 Families: Seven Steps to Building a Strong Family
 2002 Seeing the Unseen: Preparing Yourself for Spiritual Warfare (Expanded)
 2003 Getting Past Guilt: Embracing God's Forgiveness
 2006 The Real Heaven: It's Not What You Think
 2009 Your Love Path
 2010 The True Heaven: Not What You Thought, Better Than You Expected
 2012 The Art of Falling in Love

Notes

References

  
 CBS: "The Sex Preacher"
 WSMV Story: Church Goers Receive Sex Advice from Minister
 Fox Morning Show with Mike and Juliet

External links 
 Joe Beam Official Website
 Relationship Enrichment Organization Joe Beam Founded
 Give and Take Radio Website
 Joe Beam's Marriage Helper Website
 Western Hills Church

American Christian writers
Living people
University of Evansville alumni
University of Sydney alumni
Year of birth missing (living people)